Dalili is a Persian surname. Notable people with the surname include:

Raz Dalili (born 1959), peace educator in Afghanistan
Raz Mohammed Dalili (born 1959), Governor of Paktia Province in Afghanistan

Persian-language surnames